Listed buildings in Devon are of special interest and are divided into three grades:

Grade I listed buildings in Devon, of exceptional interest
Grade II* listed buildings in Devon, more than special interest
Grade II listed buildings in Devon, special interest